Daredevil is the name of several comic book titles featuring the character Daredevil and published by Marvel Comics, beginning with the original Daredevil comic book series which debuted in 1964.

While Daredevil had been home to the work of comic-book artists such as Everett, Kirby, Wally Wood, John Romita Sr., Gene Colan, and Joe Quesada, among others, Frank Miller's influential tenure on the title in the early 1980s cemented the character as a popular and influential part of the Marvel Universe.

Publication history

1960s
Daredevil debuted in Marvel Comics' Daredevil #1 (cover date April 1964), created by writer-editor Stan Lee and artist Bill Everett, with character design input from Jack Kirby, who devised Daredevil's billy club. When Everett turned in his first-issue pencils extremely late, Marvel production manager Sol Brodsky and Spider-Man co-creator Steve Ditko inked a large variety of different backgrounds, a "lot of backgrounds and secondary figures on the fly and cobbled the cover and the splash page together from Kirby's original concept drawing".

Wally Wood, known for his 1950s EC Comics stories, penciled and inked issues #5–10, introducing Daredevil's modern red costume in issue #7. Issue #7, featuring Daredevil's battle against the Sub-Mariner, has become one of the most iconic and reprinted stories of the series.

Issue #12 began a brief run by Jack Kirby (layouts) and John Romita Sr. The issue marked Romita's return to superhero penciling after a decade of working exclusively as a romance-comic artist for DC. Romita had felt he no longer wanted to pencil, in favor of being solely an inker. He recalled in 1999,

Romita later elaborated:

When Romita left to take over The Amazing Spider-Man, Lee gave Daredevil to what would be the character's first signature artist, Gene Colan, who began with issue #20 (September  1966). Though #20 identifies Colan as a fill-in penciller, Romita's work load prevented him from returning to the title, and Colan ended up penciling all but three issues through #100 (June 1973), plus the 1967 annual, followed by ten issues sprinkled from 1974 to 1979. He would return again for an eight-issue run in 1997.

Lee never gave Colan a full script for an issue of Daredevil; instead, he would tell him the plot, and Colan would tape record the conversation to refer to while drawing the issue, leaving Lee to add the script in afterwards. Though Colan is consistently credited as penciler only, Lee would typically give him the freedom to fill in details of the plot as he saw fit. Lee explained "If I would tell Gene who the villain was and what the problem was, how the problem should be resolved and where it would take place, Gene could fill in all the details. Which made it very interesting for me to write because when I got the artwork back and had to put in the copy, I was seeing things that I'd not expected." The 31-issue Lee/Colan run on the series included Daredevil #47, in which Murdock defends a blind Vietnam veteran against a frameup; Lee has cited it as the story he is most proud of out of his entire career. With issue #51, Lee turned the writing chores over to Roy Thomas (who succeeded him on a number of Marvel's titles), but would remain on board as editor for another 40 issues.

1970s
18-year-old Gerry Conway took over as writer with issue #72, and turned the series in a pulp science fiction direction. He also moved Daredevil to San Francisco beginning with Daredevil #86, and simultaneously brought on the Black Widow as co-star. Conway explained,  Concerning the Black Widow, he said, "I was a fan of Natasha [Romanoff, the Black Widow], and thought she and Daredevil would have interesting chemistry." She served as Daredevil's co-star and love interest from #81–124 (November 1971–August 1975), of which #93-108 were cover titled Daredevil and the Black Widow. The series had been suffering from slowly declining popularity, and in November 1971 Marvel announced that Daredevil and Iron Man would be combined into a single series, but the addition of the Black Widow revitalized interest in the comic. Due to the Comics Code Authority's restrictions on the depiction of cohabitation, the stories made explicit that though Daredevil and the Black Widow were living in the same apartment, they were sleeping on separate floors, and that Natasha's guardian Ivan Petrovich was always close at hand.

Steve Gerber came on board with issue #97, initially scripting over Conway's plots, but Gene Colan's long stint as Daredevil's penciler had come to an end. Gerber recollected, "Gene and I did a few issues together, but Gene was basically trying to move on at that point. He'd just started the Dracula book, and he'd been doing Daredevil for God knows how many years. I think he wanted to do something else." After six issues with fill-in pencilers, including several with Don Heck, Bob Brown took over as penciller.

Tony Isabella succeeded Gerber as writer, but editor Len Wein disapproved of his take on the series and sent him off after only five issues, planning to write it himself. Instead, he ended up handing both writing and editing jobs to his friend Marv Wolfman with issue #124, which introduced inker Klaus Janson to the title. It also wrote the Black Widow out of the series and returned Daredevil to Hell's Kitchen; the post-Conway writers had all felt that Daredevil worked better as a solo hero, and had been working to gradually remove the Widow from the series. Wolfman's 20-issue run included the introduction of one of Daredevil's most popular villains, Bullseye. He was dissatisfied with his work and quit, later explaining, "I felt DD needed something more than I was giving him. I was never very happy with my DD—I never found the thing that made him mine the way Frank Miller did a year or two later. So I was trying to find things to do that interested me and therefore, I hoped, the readers. Ultimately, I couldn't find anything that made DD unique to me and asked off the title." His departure coincided with Brown's death from leukemia.

With issue #144, Jim Shooter became the writer and was joined by a series of short-term pencilers, including Gil Kane, who had been penciling most of Daredevil's covers since #80 but had never before worked on the comic's interior. The series's once solid sales began dropping during this period, and was downgraded to bi-monthly status with issue #147. Shooter still had difficulty keeping up with the schedule, and the writing chores were shortly turned over to Roger McKenzie.

McKenzie's work on Daredevil reflected his background in horror comics, and the stories and even the character himself took on a much darker tone. McKenzie created chain-smoking Daily Bugle reporter Ben Urich, who deduces Daredevil's secret identity over the course of issues #153–163.

Halfway through his run, McKenzie was joined by penciler Frank Miller, who had previously drawn Daredevil in The Spectacular Spider-Man #27 (February 1979), with issue #158 (May 1979).

1980s

Sales had been declining since the end of the Wolfman/Brown run, and by the time Miller became Daredevil's penciler, the series was in danger of cancellation. Moreover, Miller disliked Roger McKenzie's scripts, and Jim Shooter (who had since become Marvel's editor-in-chief) had to talk him out of quitting. Seeking to appease Miller, and impressed by a short backup feature he had written, new editor Denny O'Neil fired McKenzie so that Miller could write the series. The last issue of McKenzie's run plugs a two-part story which was pulled from publication, as its mature content encountered resistance from the Comics Code Authority, though part one eventually saw print in Daredevil #183, by which time Code standards had relaxed.

Miller continued the title in a similar vein to McKenzie. Resuming the drastic metamorphosis the previous writer had begun, Miller took the step of essentially ignoring all of Daredevil's continuity prior to his run on the series; on the occasions where older villains and supporting cast were used, their characterizations and history with Daredevil were reworked or overwritten. Spider-Man villain Kingpin was introduced as Daredevil's new nemesis, displacing most of his large rogues gallery. Daredevil himself was gradually developed into an antihero. Comics historian Les Daniels noted that "Almost immediately, [Miller] began to attract attention with his terse tales of urban crime." Miller's revamping of the title was controversial among fans, but it clicked with new readers, and sales began soaring, the comic returning to monthly status just three issues after Miller came on as writer.

Miller introduced previously unseen characters who had played a major part in his youth, such as Elektra, an ex-girlfriend turned lethal ninja assassin. Elektra was killed fighting Bullseye in issue #181 (April 1982), an issue which saw brisk sales.

With #185, inker Janson began doing the pencils over Miller's layouts, and after #191 Miller left the series entirely. O'Neil switched from editor to writer. O'Neil was not enthusiastic about the switch, later saying "I took the gig mostly because there didn't seem to be (m)any other viable candidates for it." He continued McKenzie and Miller's noir take on the series, but backed away from the antihero depiction of the character. Janson left shortly after Miller, replaced initially by penciler William Johnson and inker Danny Bulanadi, who were both supplanted by David Mazzucchelli. Miller returned as the title's regular writer, co-writing #226 with O'Neil. Miller and Mazzucchelli crafted the acclaimed "Daredevil: Born Again" storyline in #227–233. Miller intended to produce an additional two-part story with artist Walt Simonson but the story was never completed and remains unpublished.

Three fill-in issues followed before Steve Englehart (under the pseudonym "John Harkness") took the post of writer, only to lose it after one issue due to a plot conflict with one of the fill-ins. Ann Nocenti was brought on as a fill-in writer but became the series's longest-running regular writer, with a four-and-a-quarter-year run from #238 to #291 (January 1987 – April 1991). The shuffle of short-term artists continued for her first year, until John Romita Jr. joined as penciller from #250 to #282 (January 1988 – July 1990) alongside inker Al Williamson, who stayed on through #300.

The team returned Murdock to law by co-founding with Page a nonprofit drug and legal clinic, while Nocenti crafted stories confronting feminism, drug abuse, nuclear proliferation, and animal rights-inspired terrorism.

1990s
New writer D. G. Chichester and penciler Lee Weeks continued from where Nocenti left off. The critically acclaimed "Last Rites" arc from #297–300 saw Daredevil regaining his attorney's license and finally bringing the Kingpin to justice.

The creative team of Chichester and penciler Scott McDaniel changed the status quo with their "Fall From Grace" storyline in issues #319–325 (August 1993 – February 1994). Elektra, who was resurrected in #190 but had not been seen since, finally returned.

Under writers Karl Kesel and later Joe Kelly, the title gained a lighter tone, with Daredevil returning to the lighthearted, wisecracking hero depicted by earlier writers. Gene Colan returned to the series during this time, but though initially enthusiastic about drawing Daredevil again, he quit after seven issues, complaining that Kesel and Kelly's scripts were too "retro".

In 1998, Daredevils numbering was rebooted, with the title "canceled" with issue #380 and revived a month later as part of the Marvel Knights imprint. Joe Quesada drew the new series, written by filmmaker Kevin Smith. Its first story arc, "Guardian Devil", depicts Daredevil struggling to protect a child whom he is told could either be the Messiah or the Anti-Christ.

Smith was succeeded by writer-artist David Mack, who contributed the seven-issue "Parts of a Hole" (vol. 2, #9–15).

2000s
David Mack brought independent-comics colleague Brian Michael Bendis to Marvel to co-write the following arc, "Wake Up" in vol. 2, #16–19 (May 2001 – August 2001). Following Mack and Bendis were Back to the Future screenwriter Bob Gale and artists Phil Winslade and David Ross for the story "Playing to the Camera". Mack continued to contribute covers, while Brian Michael Bendis wrote further stories such as Daredevil: Ninja.

Issue #26 (December 2001) brought back Brian Michael Bendis, working this time with artist Alex Maleev. IGN called Bendis's four-year-run "one of the greatest creative tenures in Marvel history" and commented that it rivaled Frank Miller's work.

Writer Ed Brubaker and artist Michael Lark became the new creative team with Daredevil vol. 2, #82 (February 2006), no longer under the Marvel Knights imprint.

The series returned to its original numbering with issue #500 (October 2009), which followed vol. 2, #119 (August 2009). New writer Andy Diggle revised the status quo, with Daredevil assuming leadership of the ninja army the Hand.

2010s
Following this came the crossover story arc "Shadowland". Murdock then leaves New York, leaving his territory in the hands of the Black Panther in the briefly retitled series' Black Panther: Man Without Fear #513.

In July 2011, Daredevil relaunched with vol. 3, #1 (September  2011), with writer Mark Waid and penciler Paolo Rivera. Waid said he was interested in "tweaking the adventure-to-depression ratio a bit and letting Matt win again". Daredevil vol. 3 ended at issue #36 in February 2014.

Daredevil volume 4 launched under Waid and Chris Samnee with a new issue #1 (March 2014) as part of the All-New Marvel NOW! storyline.

Daredevil volume 4 officially ended with issue #18 in September 2015. A new volume began as part of the All-New, All-Different Marvel branding, written by Charles Soule with art by Ron Garney with the first two issues released in December 2015. Charles Soule released his final Daredevil storyline "Death of Daredevil" during the October and November 2018 releases, in a 4-part bimonthly release which ended the series.

2020s 
Afterwards the series went on hiatus for two months and resumed distribution in February 2019, with a brand-new volume written by Chip Zdarsky. The primary artist on the series is Marco Checchetto. In August 2021, it was confirmed that volume 6 of the series would end in November 2021, at issue #36. The series lead into the crossover event Devil's Reign with the same creative team. Following the conclusion of that series, Daredevil volume 7, also written by Zdarsky, was launched in July 2022. In March 2023, it was announced Zdarsky's time on Daredevil would end in August 2023.

Reception
Empire praised Frank Miller's era, and referenced Brian Michael Bendis, Jeph Loeb, and Kevin Smith's tenures on the series. IGN ranked Daredevil as the third best series from Marvel Comics in 2006

The series has won the following awards as well:
 Daredevil #227: "Apocalypse", Best Single Issue – 1986 Kirby Awards
 Daredevil: Born Again, Best Writer/Artist (single or team), Frank Miller and David Mazzucchelli – 1987 Kirby Awards
 Daredevil: The Man Without Fear, Favorite Limited Comic-Book Series – 1993 Comics Buyer's Guide Fan Award
 Daredevil by writer Brian Michael Bendis and artist Alex Maleev, 2003 Eisner Awards (for works published in 2002)
 Daredevil, Best Writer, Ed Brubaker – 2007 Harvey Award
 Daredevil #7, Best Single Issue (or One-Shot) – 2012 Eisner Awards (for works published in 2011)
 Daredevil by Mark Waid, Marcos Martín, Paolo Rivera, and Joe Rivera, Best Continuing Series – 2012 Eisner Awards
 David Mazzucchelli's Daredevil Born Again: Artist's Edition, edited by Scott Dunbier (IDW),Best Archival Collection – 2013 Eisner Awards
 Chris Samnee, Daredevil v3, Best Penciller/Inker – 2013 Eisner Awards

References

1964 comics debuts
Comics by Brian Michael Bendis
Comics by Dennis O'Neil
Comics by Ed Brubaker
Comics by Frank Miller (comics)
Comics by Gerry Conway
Comics by J. M. DeMatteis
Comics by Kevin Smith
Comics by Mark Waid
Comics by Marv Wolfman
Comics by Roy Thomas
Comics by Stan Lee
Comics by Steve Gerber
Comics set in New York City
Crime comics
 
Literature about blind people
Marvel Comics adapted into films
Marvel Comics titles